Five West Sea Islands (Korean: 西海五島/서해오도) refers to the five islands in the West Sea (Yellow Sea) administrated by Incheon, South Korea. They are Yeonpyeongdo, Baengnyeongdo, Daecheongdo, Socheongdo and Soyeonpyeongdo. Their positions are much closer to North Korea as these islands are originally part of Hwanghae Province and their sovereignties are claimed by North Korea, but they are since then, controlled by South Korea since the United Nations forces established the Northern Limit Line (NLL) north of the islands in 1953 following the Korean War.

References 

Islands of the Yellow Sea
Islands of Incheon
Ongjin County, Incheon
Territorial disputes of North Korea
Territorial disputes of South Korea
North Korea–South Korea border
North Korea–South Korea relations